The Fremont National Recreation Trail is a long-distance multi-use trail in Southern Oregon's Fremont-Winema National Forest. It is also known as the Southern Oregon Intertie Trail and trail #160.

The route goes southeast from Yamsay Mountain to Vee Lake. There are two main sections separated by about 13 miles of rural road and highway.

External links
Official Website

National Recreation Trails in Oregon
Hiking trails in Oregon